Luke Bambridge and Neal Skupski were the defending champions but only Bambridge chose to defend his title, partnering Ben McLachlan. Bambridge lost in the quarterfinals to Treat Huey and Adil Shamasdin.

Robert Lindstedt and Jonny O'Mara won the title after defeating Huey and Shamasdin 6–2, 7–5 in the final.

Seeds

Draw

References

External links
 Main draw

Odlum Brown Vancouver Open - Men's Doubles
2019 Men's Doubles